Vaseyochloa is a genus of plants in the grass family. The only known species is Vaseyochloa multinervosa, or Texasgrass, native to southern and south-central Texas.

References

Chloridoideae
Endemic flora of Texas
Native grasses of Texas
Monotypic Poaceae genera
Taxa named by A. S. Hitchcock